c-base e.V. is a non-profit association located in Berlin, Germany. Its purpose is to increase knowledge and skills pertaining to computer software, hardware and data networks. The association is engaged in numerous related activities. For example, the society has had stands at large festivals, such as Children's Day, where they introduce young people to topics like robotics and computer-aided design.

The association's headquarters, c-base station, is also used by other initiatives and groups in and around Berlin as an event location or as function rooms, for example the wireless community network freifunk.net, the Chaos Computer Club and the Berlin Wikipedia group.  Any group that identifies themselves with the purpose of the c-base are also welcome to use the premises for meetings and events.

History 

Seventeen people founded c-base e. V. in the autumn of 1995. In the years 2002 and 2003 the BerlinBackBone project was launched to make available and promote free public access to the internet via wireless community networks. Also in 2003 the c-base association began staging weekly meetings of musicians, called Cosmic Open Stage, thus providing a platform for well known or unknown musicians to hold jam sessions or to give concerts. Since 2004 the premises of the c-base association are also used in cooperation by transmediale.

c-base is recognized as one of the first hackerspaces in the world.  It, along with The Loft in San Diego, USA and Metalab, directly influenced the creation of hackerspaces in the US.

Activities 

Apart from the main purpose of the c-base association the members are also engaged in many other activities, for example Go and Jugger, the rules of which supposedly were gained through analysis of files on c-beam, the main computer in the c-base station. Once a year, @c-terra, an event organised by the c-base association, gives an overview of all activities offered.

The premises of the c-base association host a lot of different events (parties, presentations, theatrical performances, concerts and art exhibitions), such as Cosmic Open Stage.

The c-base society is also present at events of the Chaos Computer Club like the Chaos Communication Congress or the Chaos Communication Camp.

From September 14–16, 2006 the fourth Wizards of OS conference was held in cooperation with c-base.

Mythological self-image of the c-base 
The location for c-base is accompanied by a myth. This myth says that there are remnants of a space station called c-base underneath the city centre of Berlin. The space station's antenna is the Fernsehturm Berlin, a large spire with a mirrored ball near the top and a distinctive landmark nearby.

History of the space station 
According to the stories of the members of the c-base, the space station crashed due to unstable conditions in its orbit after exiting a time warp. At that time there was a number of highly technological advanced and heretofore undiscovered lifeforms aboard the station. Much evidence of its existence is said to be in and around Berlin, including the aforementioned antenna, which was (according to stories) unmasked by East German and Soviet scientists. Other evidence, such as the multifunctional space station module, which ejected during the crash, is now under intense research and makes up the current premises of the c-base association.

There is currently only a printed edition of the collected knowledge about the space station, known as the "space almanack" (Ger.: Allmanach). A project, called "c-pedia", is currently underway, attempting to make this knowledge available on the internet. There is also a reconstruction of station artifacts taking place.

Structure of c-base 
The c-base is a system of seven concentric rings that can move in relation to one another. Each ring is considered a single module with a special set of functions. The rings are called (from the centre out) "core", "com", "culture", "creactiv", "cience", "carbon" and "clamp".

The inner ring, core, provides a nonterminating supply of energy produced by a Möbius strip generator. The central computer of the c-base, "c-beam", is also located there. The second ring, com, harbours the space ports, hangars and communication devices including the interstellar communication module recently identified as Blinkenlights by the Chaos Computer Club. The following three rings, culture, creactiv and cience, host devices serving culture, creativity and science. The latter ring is also the location of the Arboretum. Accommodation for station crew members are found on the carbon ring. The outer ring, clamp, stabilizes the station.

Trivia 
 On September 10, 2006, the Pirate Party Germany was established at c-base.
 Episode 430, "Tödliches Labyrinth" and Episode 691 "Tod einer Heuschrecke" of German television series Tatort was filmed at c-base.
 The Wikipedia local chapter has met at c-base regularly since 2004.

Literature 
 c-booc: 20 years history publication of c-base
 c-base e. V.: c-base. official handout v.6.0s, Berlin 2004

External links 

 c-base-Homepage 
 c-base – space station in Berlin 
 c-base at myspace.com showing videos and music of some members

References 

Computer clubs in Germany
Mutual organizations
Hackerspaces
Non-profit organisations based in Berlin
Culture in Berlin
Hacker culture